Ali Tabatabaei (24 October 1983 – 30 August 2015) was an Iranian film and television actor.

Personal life
Tabatabaei was born in Tehran in 1983 and was the son of Iranian film and television producer Kamal Tabatabaei. He died in 2015 at the age of 32 by heart attack.

Filmography

Cinema
Salad Fasl
Sa'at 25Asbe Sefid PadeshahTV SeriesBajenagh'haTaraneh MadariAshpaz BashiBachehaye Nesbatan BadGhalbe Yakhi''

References

1983 births
2015 deaths
Male actors from Tehran
21st-century Iranian male actors
Iranian male film actors
Iranian male television actors